Brian H. Warr is a Canadian politician, who was elected to the Newfoundland and Labrador House of Assembly in the 2015 provincial election. He represents the electoral district of Baie Verte-Green Bay as a member of the Liberal Party.

Prior to his election, Warr was a businessman in Springdale.

In 2017, Warr was appointed Deputy Speaker and Chair of Committees of the House of Assembly serving until the 2019 election.

Warr was re-elected in the 2019 provincial election. Following the Ball government's re-election, Warr has appointed to cabinet as Minister of Education and Early Childhood Development, making him the first new cabinet appointee following the 2019 Newfoundland and Labrador general election. On August 19, 2020, Warr was appointed Minister of Children, Seniors and Social Development, Minister Responsible for NL Housing Corp, and Minister Responsible for Persons with Disabilities in the Furey government.

Warr was re-elected in the 2021 provincial election. He was dropped from Cabinet in April 2021.

References

Living people
Liberal Party of Newfoundland and Labrador MHAs
21st-century Canadian politicians
Year of birth missing (living people)
Members of the Executive Council of Newfoundland and Labrador